The  is a Kofun period burial mound located in what is now the Nakane neighborhood of city of Hitachinaka in Ibaraki Prefecture in the northern Kantō region of Japan. It received protection as a National Historic Site in 1974.

Overview
The Torazuka Kofun is located in a forested plateau at an elevation of about 20 meters, where several other kofun tumuli have been found. It was excavated by Meiji University in 1973, and was found to be a rare example of a decorated kofun. The tumulus is a medium-sized  , which is shaped like a keyhole, having one square end and one circular end, when viewed from above, with a total length of 56.5 meters. The tumulus was once surrounded by a moat.

Internally, the tumulus has a stone burial chamber made from large blocks of tuff that opens to the south side of the posterior circular portion, and which was found to be intact from ancient times. The chamber has a length of 2.8 meters, width of 1.8 meters, height of 1.4 meters. Within was the skeletal remains of one adult male. Grave goods included a lacquered small iron sword, iron spears, fragments of armor and horse harnesses, iron stirrups, and other items. Of great interest was the fact that the walls, floor and ceiling of the burial chamber had been painted and decorated. The floor and ceiling were vermillion, whereas the walls were coating in a white clay and covered with geometric patterns in vermillion. These drawings included concentric circles, hourglass-shaped designed and a serrated border at the ceiling.

The opening of the burial chamber was the first time in Japan that a scientific survey (for temperature and humidity, microorganisms, etc.) had been conducted prior to the opening of the intact stone chamber. 
The construction of the tumulus is estimated to be in the first half of the 7th century.

The tumulus is open to the public for a couple of days each year in the spring March–April and autumn November. It is located about 15 minutes by car from Katsuta Station on the JR East Jōban Line. Or about five minutes by car from Nakane Station on the Minato Line.

Total length 56.5 meters:
Anterior rectangular portion  38.5 meters wide x 7.2 meters high 
Posterior circular portion 32.5 meter diameter x 7.5 meters

See also

List of Historic Sites of Japan (Ibaraki)

References

External links

 Ibaraki Tourist Information 
 Hitachinaka City official site 
Ibaraki Prefectural Board of Education 

Kofun
History of Ibaraki Prefecture
Hitachinaka, Ibaraki
Historic Sites of Japan
Hitachi Province